Moravičany is a municipality and village in Šumperk District in the Olomouc Region of the Czech Republic. It has about 1,300 inhabitants.

Administrative parts
Villages of Doubravice and Mitrovice are administrative parts of Moravičany.

Sights
The most important landmark of Moravičany is the Church of Saint George. Existence of the church was first documented in the 14th century. It was rebuilt in 1615 and then in the second half of the 18th century, when a baroque chapel was added.

Notable people
Anežka Hodinová-Spurná (1897–1963), politician
Štěpánka Mertová (1930–2004), athlete

References

Villages in Šumperk District